Zhu Bangzao (born 1952) is a retired Chinese diplomat who served as Ambassador: to Tunisia and the State of Palestine (2002–03), Switzerland (2004–08), and Andorra and Spain (2009–14).

Biography
Zhu was born in Yixing County, Jiangsu, in 1952. During the Cultural Revolution, he taught at Nanjing Foreign Language School between 1971 and 1973. In 1973, he was admitted to Beijing Foreign Studies University. majoring in French language. After graduating in 1977, he was sent abroad to study at the University of Geneva on government scholarships.

Zhu returned to China in 1979 and joined the foreign service that same year and has served primarily in the Translation Office of the Ministry of Foreign Affairs. In 1988, he become secretary of the Chinese Embassy in the France, a position he held until 1992, when he was recalled to the Ministry of Foreign Affairs as director and counsellor of the Western European Department. In 1996, he was made counsellor of the Chinese Embassy in Belgium and the European Community. In 1997, he was appointed as spokesperson for the Ministry of Foreign Affairs and later was prompted to director of the Foreign Ministry Information Department. In March 2004, he succeeded  as Chinese Ambassador to Switzerland, serving in that position from 2004 to 2008. In January 2009, President Hu Jintao named him  and Spain, and he held the posts from 2009 until 2014.

Personal life 
Zhu married Chen Lichun and the couple has a son.

References

1952 births
Living people
People from Yixing
Beijing Foreign Studies University alumni
University of Geneva alumni
École nationale d'administration alumni
Spokespersons for the Ministry of Foreign Affairs of the People's Republic of China
Ambassadors of China to Tunisia
Ambassadors of China to the State of Palestine
Ambassadors of China to Switzerland
Ambassadors of China to Spain
Ambassadors of China to Andorra
Diplomats of the People's Republic of China